Sesqui, Latin for one-and-one-half times, may refer to:

Sodium sesquicarbonate, a double salt of sodium bicarbonate and sodium carbonate
Sesqui 1990, a 1990 festival in Wellington, New Zealand
Sesquialtera (disambiguation), several meanings
Sesquicentennial Exposition, a 1926 world's fair in Philadelphia, Pennsylvania, U.S.
Sesquilinear, a property of the dot product in complex, multi-dimensional spaces
Sesquiplane, a type of biplane where one wing is significantly smaller than the other

See also
Number prefix